Bluff City is an unincorporated town (no elected mayor) in Nevada County, Arkansas, United States. The population was 158 at the 2000 census. It is part of the Hope Micropolitan Statistical Area.

Geography

Demographics

As of the census of 2000, there were 158 people, 66 households, and 46 families residing in the town. The population density was 69.4 inhabitants per square mile (26.8/km2). The racial makeup of the town was 27.22% White, 71.52% Black or African American and 1.27% Native American.

There were 66 households, out of which 22.7% had children under the age of 18 living with them, 48.5% were married couples living together, 13.6% had a female householder with no husband present, and 30.3% were non-families. 28.8% of all households were made up of individuals, and 13.6% had someone living alone who was 65 years of age or older. The average household size was 2.39 and the average family size was 2.96.

In the town, the population was spread out, with 19.0% under the age of 18, 6.3% from 18 to 24, 24.7% from 25 to 44, 31.0% from 45 to 64, and 19.0% who were 65 years of age or older. The median age was 45 years. For every 100 females there were 129.0 males. For every 100 females age 18 and over, there were 103.2 males.

The median income for a household in the town was $25,500, and the median income for a family was $26,667. Males had a median income of $37,917 versus $20,000 for females. The per capita income for the town was $14,358. About 19.0% of families and 23.6% of the population were below the poverty line, including 33.3% of those under the age of eighteen and 17.4% of those 65 or over.

Infrastructure

Highways
  Arkansas Highway 24
  Arkansas Highway 299
  Arkansas Highway 387

References

External links
 Encyclopedia of Arkansas History & Culture entry

Towns in Nevada County, Arkansas
Towns in Arkansas
Hope micropolitan area